The Wilderness or The Savage Land (原野 Yuanye) is a 1936 play by Cao Yu. The play was influenced by Eugene O'Neill's expressionist theatre and relates a succession of murders and stories of revenge set in a forest. At the time the play was published, social realism was the rage in China, and critics were not pleased with the work's supernatural and fantastical elements. There was a resurgence of interest in The Wilderness in 1980, however, and Cao Yu, then 70 years old, collaborated in staging a production of his play. Other notable modern stagings include that of Wang Yansong in 2006.

Adaptations
The play was made into a 1981 film The Savage Land, and an opera, of the same name by composer Jin Xiang, in 1987.

References

External links
 

1936 plays
Plays by Cao Yu
Chinese plays adapted into films
Plays adapted into operas